The Picatinny rail ( or ), or Pic rail for short, also known as a MIL-STD-1913 rail, 1913 rail or STANAG 2324 rail (cancelled), is a rail integration system that provides a mounting platform for firearm accessories. It was originally used for mounting of scopes atop the receivers of larger caliber rifles.

Once established as United States Military Standard, its use expanded to also attaching other accessories, such as: iron sights, tactical lights, laser aiming modules, night vision devices, reflex sights, holographic sights, foregrips, bipods, slings and bayonets.

An updated version of the rail is adopted as a NATO standard as the STANAG 4694 NATO Accessory Rail.

History 

Attempts to standardize the Weaver rail designs date back to the early 1980s from work by the A.R.M.S. company and Otto Repa. Specifications for the M16A2E4 rifle and the M4E1 carbine received type classification generic in December 1994. These were the M16A2 and the M4 modified with new upper receivers where rails replaced hand guards. 

The rail itself is named after the Picatinny Arsenal in New Jersey, which was named "after the Lenape-named peak overlooking the old forge, loosely translated to mean 'rugged cliff by water' or 'water by the hills'."  The Picatinny Arsenal  was tasked in 1992 to develop a standardized mounting system after the U.S. Army was dissatisfied with the contemporary products on the market.  The Picatinny team was headed by mechanical designer Gary Houtsma (who was awarded the Order of Saint Maurice Award in 2014 for this contribution), who took the measurements from 20 or so different Weaver rail products from weapons bunkers at Picatinny (and even local sporting goods stores) and came up with an average set of numbers set on a 45-degree angled surface.

Houtsma then took the specifications over to the production facility and requested they design a dimensioning style so the rail could be easily produced and inspected.  The factory recognized the similarity of the purposed rail interface to the existing rail design on 105 mm howitzers, so they chose to scale down the howitzer rail design and co-opted the production and inspection procedures.  The team then sent the finished prototype over to Rock Island Arsenal for review and trial, and then to the technical data section to determine if it should be a standard or a specification.  After it was determined that the new rail should be a standard, not a specification, it was adopted and fielded in 1995 with the designation MIL-STD-1913, dated February 3, 1995.

A metric-upgraded version of the Picatinny rail, the STANAG 4694 NATO Accessory Rail,  was designed in conjunction with weapon manufacturers like Aimpoint, Beretta, Colt, FN Herstal and Heckler & Koch, and was approved by the NATO Army Armaments Group (NAAG), Land Capability Group 1 Dismounted Soldier (LCG1-DS) on May 8, 2009.

Currently, many firearm manufacturers include a Picatinny rail system out of factory, such as the Ruger Mini-14 Ranch Rifle.

Design 

The rail consists of a strip undercut to form a "flattened T" with a hexagonal top cross-section, with cross slots interspersed with flats that allow accessories to be slid into place from the end of the rail and then locked in place. It is similar in concept to the earlier commercial Weaver rail mount used to mount telescopic sights, but is taller and has wider slots at regular intervals along the entire length.

Comparison to Weaver rail 

The only significant difference between the Picatinny rail and the similar Weaver rail are the size and shapes of the slots. Whereas the earlier Weaver rail is modified from a low, wide dovetail rail and has rounded slots, the Picatinny rail has a more pronounced angular section and square-bottomed slots. This means that an accessory designed for a Weaver rail will fit onto a Picatinny rail whereas the opposite might not be possible (unless the slots in the Weaver rail are modified to have square bottoms).

While some accessories are designed to fit on both Weaver and Picatinny rails, most Picatinny devices will not fit on Weaver rails. From May 2012, most mounting rails are cut to Picatinny standards. Many accessories can be secured to a rail with a single spring-loaded retaining pin.

Designed to mount heavy sights of various kinds, a great variety of accessories and attachments are now available and the rails are no longer confined to the rear upper surface (receiver) of long arms but are either fitted to or machine milled into the upper, side or lower surfaces of all manner of weapons from crossbows to pistols and long arms up to and including anti-materiel rifles.

Impact 

Because of their many uses, Picatinny rails and accessories have replaced iron sights in the design of many firearms and available as aftermarket add-on parts for most actions that do not have them integrated, and they are also on the undersides of semi-automatic pistol frames and grips.

Their usefulness has led to them being used in paintball, gel blasters and airsoft.

See also 

 NATO Accessory Rail
 Rail System (firearms)
 Third Arm Weapon Interface System
 Warsaw Pact rail
 Zeiss rail

References

External links 

 Picatinny Rail Specifications

Firearm components
Mechanical standards
Military equipment introduced in the 1990s